Achim Post (born 2 May 1959) is a German politician of the Social Democratic Party (SPD) who has been serving as a member of the Bundestag from the state of North Rhine-Westphalia since 2013.

Political career 
Post became a member of the Bundestag in the 2013 German federal election. He is a member of the Joint Committee. Since 2017, he been serving as one his parliamentary group's chairpersons, under the leadership of successive chairs Andrea Nahles (2017–2018) and Rolf Mützenich (since 2018).

In addition to his committee assignments, Post is part of the German-Egyptian Parliamentary Friendship Group.

In the negotiations to form a so-called traffic light coalition of the SPD, the Green Party and the Free Democratic Party (FDP) following the 2021 federal elections, Post was part of his party's delegation in the working group on financial regulation and the national budget, co-chaired by Doris Ahnen, Lisa Paus and Christian Dürr.

Other activities 
 KfW, Member of the Board of Supervisory Directors (since 2022)
 Business Forum of the Social Democratic Party of Germany, Member of the Political Advisory Board (since 2020)

References

External links 

  
 Bundestag biography 

1959 births
Living people
Members of the Bundestag for North Rhine-Westphalia
Members of the Bundestag 2021–2025
Members of the Bundestag 2017–2021
Members of the Bundestag 2013–2017
Members of the Bundestag for the Social Democratic Party of Germany